Gilles Verlant (11 June 1957 – 20 September 2013) was a Belgian journalist, best known as a music critic and rock expert. He was also Serge Gainsbourg's friend and wrote his definitive biography. He died from falling down a set of stairs.

Work 
Verlant published regularly in the following magazines:
 More (monthly)
 En Attendant (monthly)

Verlant has written the following books:

See also 
 Punk rock in Belgium

External links

References

Belgian journalists
Male journalists
Belgian music journalists
1957 births
2013 deaths